Kazimierz Długopolski (born 6 July 1950) is a Polish skier. He competed in the Nordic combined events at the 1972 Winter Olympics and the 1980 Winter Olympics.

References

External links
 

1950 births
Living people
Polish male Nordic combined skiers
Olympic Nordic combined skiers of Poland
Nordic combined skiers at the 1972 Winter Olympics
Nordic combined skiers at the 1980 Winter Olympics
Sportspeople from Zakopane
20th-century Polish people